Conference proceeding is a collection of academic papers published in the context of an academic conference or workshop.

Proceeding or Proceedings may also refer to:
 Legal proceeding, activity that seeks to invoke the power of a tribunal in order to enforce a law
 Proceedings (magazine), monthly magazine published by the United States Naval Institute

See also